The 2000 United States presidential election in Louisiana took place on November 7, 2000, and was part of the 2000 United States presidential election. Voters chose nine representatives, or electors to the Electoral College, who voted for president and vice president.

Louisiana was won by Governor George W. Bush, a dramatic swing from the statewide results in 1996 when Democratic President Bill Clinton carried the state with 52% of the vote and with a double-digit margin of victory. Bush won most of the parishes and congressional districts in the state. Bush dominated among the rural areas of the state. The only congressional district Gore won was the second district, which represents the very urban area of New Orleans. , this is the last election in which St. Landry Parish, West Baton Rouge Parish, and Bienville Parish voted for the Democratic candidate. It also remains the last time that Louisiana has been decided by a single-digit margin.

Louisiana was 1 of 14 states that Clinton carried at least once and was 1 of 9 states that he carried twice that Gore (whom at the time of the election was the sitting VP under Clinton) lost.

Results

Results by parish

Parishes that flipped from Democratic to Republican
Acadia (Largest city: Crowley)
Allen (Largest city: Oakdale)
Ascension (Largest city: Prairieville)
Avoyelles (Largest city: Marksville)
Calcasieu (Largest city: Lake Charles)
Caldwell (Largest city: Clarks)
Cameron (Largest city: Grand Lake)
Catahoula (Largest city: Jonesville)
Claiborne (Largest city: Homer)
Concordia (Largest city: Vidalia)
DeSoto (Largest city: Mansfield)
East Baton Rouge (Largest city: Baton Rouge)
East Feliciana (Largest city: Jackson)
Evangeline (Largest city: Ville Platte)
Franklin (Largest city: Winnsboro)
Iberia (Largest city: New Iberia)
Jackson (Largest city: Jonesboro)
Jefferson Davis (Largest city: Jennings)
Lafourche (Largest city: Thibodaux)
Lincoln (Largest city: Ruston)
Morehouse (Largest city: Bastrop)
Natchitoches (Largest city: Natchitoches)
Plaquemines (Largest city: Belle Chasse)
Rapides (Largest city: Alexandria)
Red River (Largest city: Coushatta)
Richland (Largest city: Rayville)
Sabine (Largest city: Many)
St. Bernard (Largest city: Chalmette)
St. Charles (Largest city: Luling)
St. Martin (Largest city: Breaux Bridge)
St. Mary (Largest city: Morgan City)
Tangipahoa (Largest city: Hammond)
Terrebonne (Largest city: Houma)
Vermilion (Largest city: Abbeville)
Vernon (Largest city: Leesville)
Washington (Largest city: Bogalusa)
Webster (Largest city: Minden)
West Feliciana (Largest city: St. Francisville)
Winn (Largest city: Winnfield)

Results by congressional district
Bush won 6 of 7 congressional districts, including one held by a Democrat.

Electors 

Technically the voters of Louisiana cast their ballots for electors: representatives to the Electoral College. Louisiana is allocated 9 electors because it has 7 congressional districts and 2 senators. All candidates who appear on the ballot or qualify to receive write-in votes must submit a list of 9 electors, who pledge to vote for their candidate and his or her running mate. Whoever wins the majority of votes in the state is awarded all 9 electoral votes. Their chosen electors then vote for president and vice president. Although electors are pledged to their candidate and running mate, they are not obligated to vote for them. An elector who votes for someone other than his or her candidate is known as a faithless elector.

The electors of each state and the District of Columbia met on December 18, 2000 to cast their votes for president and vice president. The Electoral College itself never meets as one body. Instead the electors from each state and the District of Columbia met in their respective capitols.

The following were the members of the Electoral College from the state. All were pledged to and voted for George W. Bush and Dick Cheney:
Patricia Brister
Donald Ensenat
Heulette Fontenot Jr.
Mike Foster
Steve Jordan
Elizabeth Levy
Al Lippman
Suzanne Haik Terrell
Michael Woods Sr.

See also
 United States presidential elections in Louisiana
 Presidency of George W. Bush

References

Louisiana
2000
2000 Louisiana elections